Group B of the 1993 Federation Cup Americas Zone was one of four pools in the Americas zone of the 1993 Federation Cup. Five teams competed in a round robin competition, with the top two teams advancing to the play-offs.

Peru vs. Barbados

Bolivia vs. Costa Rica

Peru vs. Costa Rica

Trinidad and Tobago vs. Bolivia

Peru vs. Bolivia

Trinidad and Tobago vs. Barbados

Peru vs. Trinidad and Tobago

Costa Rica vs. Barbados

Trinidad and Tobago vs. Costa Rica

Bolivia vs. Barbados

See also
Fed Cup structure

References

External links
 Fed Cup website

1993 Federation Cup Americas Zone